Sleep Country Canada Holdings Inc. is a Canadian mattress retailer and with over 250 stores operating in British Columbia, Alberta, Saskatchewan, Manitoba, Ontario, Quebec, New Brunswick, Prince Edward Island and Nova Scotia.

In 2006, the company was ranked one of the top 50 companies to work for in Canada by the Globe and Mail. It is best known for its radio jingle, "Why buy a mattress anywhere else? Ding!"

Sleep Country USA (now called Mattress Firm), an unaffiliated company, uses the same jingle.

History
In 1994, the three partners Christine Magee, Stephen K. Gunn and Gordon Lownds launched the first four Sleep Country locations in Vancouver. By 1996, the chain had expanded to Toronto with 19 new stores. Growth continued at quick rate. By 2001, the company had 72 stores in six regional markets and an estimated 40% of the market in regions where it operated.

In January 2006 the company Dormez-vous Sleep Centres Inc. with five stores in Montreal. In March 2006 it added 32 stores in the US through an acquisition of Sleep America Inc., a mattress retailer in Arizona.

On August 14, 2008, The Canadian Press reported that two Toronto-based investment firms, Birch Hill Equity Partners Management Inc. and Westerkirk Capital Inc., made a friendly takeover offer worth $356 million (CAD) for all the units of the Sleep Country Canada Income Fund, the parent company of Sleep Country Canada. This offer was accepted.

In 2015, the company went public again, in an IPO on the Toronto Stock Exchange raising $300 million. Its new ticker symbol was "ZZZ".

References

External links
 

1994 establishments in British Columbia
Retail companies established in 1994
Companies based in Toronto
Retail companies of Canada
Canadian brands
Mattresses
Companies listed on the Toronto Stock Exchange
2003 initial public offerings
2008 mergers and acquisitions
2015 initial public offerings